"On Top" was released as the first single from Flume's debut studio album, Flume. It features the vocals from American rapper T.Shirt. The track reached its peak of number 57 in Australia on 4 March 2013 and was certified Gold.

Music video
The music video was directed by Angus Lee Forbes and released on 3 June 2013.

In popular culture
"On Top" was also featured in the movie Moto 6 and in the 2014 MLB video game, MLB 14: The Show. Also featured as Twitch streamer "xQcOW"'s donation notification sound.

Track listing
 Digital download
 "On Top" – 3:51

Charts

Certifications

References

2012 singles
2012 songs
Flume (musician) songs
Future Classic singles
Song recordings produced by Flume (musician)
Songs written by Flume (musician)